Udea lerautalis is a moth in the family Crambidae. It was described by Claude Tautel in 2014. It is found on the Mediterranean island of Corsica.

References

lerautalis
Moths described in 2014
Moths of Europe